The Raid may refer to:
 "The Raid" (story), a story by Leo Tolstoy
 The Raid (1954 film), an American Civil War film
 The Raid (1991 film), a Hong Kong action comedy film
 The Raid (2011 film), an Indonesian action film
 The Raid 2, a 2014 sequel to the Indonesian film
 Raid Gauloises, or The Raid, a former event in adventure racing
 The Raid, a song by King Gizzard & the Lizard Wizard, see Eyes Like the Sky

See also
 Raid (disambiguation)